James Grant (1802, Elgin, Moray – 23 May 1879, London) was a British author and newspaper editor.

Grant helped to found the Elgin Courier in 1827, editing it until 1833. Moving to London, he worked on the Standard, the Morning Chronicle and the Morning Advertiser. He also edited the London Saturday Journal (1839-1841) and Grant's London Journal (1841-2). From 1850 to 1871 he edited the Morning Advertiser. Calvinist in religion, he edited the Christian Standard from 1872.

Works
Random recollections of the House of Lords from the year 1830 to 1836 including personal sketches of the leading members, 1836
The great metropolis, 1836
The bench and the bar, 1837
Metropolitan pulpit; or, Sketches of the most popular preachers in London, 1839
Travels in town, 1839
Walks and wanderings in the world of literature, 1839
Portraits of public characters, 1841
Lights and shadows of London life,  1842
Joseph Jenkins; or, Leaves from the life of a literary man, 1843
Impressions of Ireland and the Irish, 1844
Paris and its people, 1844
Pictures of popular people, or, Illustrations of human nature, 1846
Pictures of life. The dwellings of the poor, 1855
The controversy on important theological questions : between the "Eclectic Review", the Rev. Newman Hall, Rev. Thomas Binney, ... on the one side, and Mr. James Grant, editor of the "Morning Advertiser" on the other, 1856
Who is right, and who wrong? : correspondence between the Rev. Thomas Binney and Mr. James Grant (of the Morning advertiser) on new aspects of the controversy on important theological questions, 1857
God is love; or, Glimpses of the father's infinite affection for his people / by the author of "The brother born for adversity, 3rd ed. 1858
The comforter; or, The Holy Spirit in his glorious person and gracious work, 1859
Our heavenly home : or, glimpses of the glory and bliss of the better world, 1859
Personal visit to the chief scenes of the religious revivals in the North of Ireland, ca.1859
Gleams of glory from the celestial world, 1860
Sources of joy in seasons of sorrow, 1860
The glorious Gospel of Christ: considered in its relation to the present life, 1861
God's unspeakable gift; or, Views of the person and work of Jesus Christ, 1861
Sketches in London, 1861
The foes of our faith, and how to defeat them; or, The weapons of our warfare with modern infidelity, 1862
The dying command of Christ; or, The duty of believers to celebrate weekly the Sacrament of the Lord's Supper, 1863
First love and last love : a tale of the Indian Mutiny, 1863
Grace and glory; or, The believer's bliss in both world. 1863
Steps and stages on the road to glory, 1865
The hymns of heaven : or, the songs of the saints in glory, 1867
The divinity of Christ : demonstrated by proofs drawn from the book of Revelation, 1867
Seasons of solitude; or, Moments of meditation on the things of eternity, 1868
The religious tendencies of the times; or, How to deal with the deadly errors and dangerous delusions of the day, 1869
Memoirs of Sir George Sinclair, Bart., of Ulbster [sic.],  1870
The newspaper press; its origin--progress--and present position, 3 vols, 1871-2
The Plymouth brethren: their history and heresies, 1875
Popish versions of the scriptures and the British and Foreign Bible Society, 1877
Meditations on the loving words of our loving Lord and Saviour, 1877

References

External links

People from Elgin, Moray
British newspaper editors
1802 births
1879 deaths
19th-century British journalists
British male journalists
19th-century British male writers
19th-century British writers